Diving at the 2002 West Asian Games was held at Fahad Al-Ahmad Swimming Complex, Kuwait City, Kuwait from 4 April to 7 April 2002.

Medalists

Medal table

References

Official website

External links
Olympic Council of Asia - 2002 West Asian Games

West Asian Games
2002 West Asian Games
2002